Ken Caryl, commonly known as Ken Caryl Ranch, is an unincorporated community and a census-designated place (CDP) located in and governed by Jefferson County, Colorado, United States. The CDP is a part of the Denver–Aurora–Lakewood, CO Metropolitan Statistical Area. The population of the Ken Caryl CDP was 32,438 at the United States Census 2010. The Ken Caryl Ranch Metropolitan District and the Ken Caryl Ranch Water District provide services. The Littleton post office (Zip code 80127) serves the area.

History
Ken Caryl's history begins with Denver Major Robert B. Bradford's purchase of the property in 1859. He soon built the Bradford/Perley House, as well as a toll road ($1.50 per wagon) to aid travelers moving west from Denver in 1859. The combination of the Bradford/Perley House Inn and the toll road heading towards the mining camps proved fairly lucrative for Bradford. The construction of a competing road up Turkey Creek Canyon in 1867 (known as Highway 285 in the modern day) that replaced Bradford’s more difficult route ultimately doomed his enterprise. After his death in 1876, his widow eventually relinquished the property in 1881. Owners came and went for a period of almost 20 years.

During the ranch's heyday, a number of well-known Colorado natives frequented Ken Caryl, including the notorious Civil War butcher John Chivington. Another regular was Ute chief Colorow. Although Colorow and other Utes in the area were removed after the Meeker Massacre of 1879, he did leave a legacy. Present day Colorow Elementary school was named for him, and a rock formation in the area that was apparently one of his favorite lairs continues to be known as “Colorow's Cave".

In 1895, Ken Caryl was transformed into a stable working farm when James Adam Perley purchased the house. Finding success as a dairy farmer, he and his family lived there comfortably until they sold the property to John Shaffer in 1914. After renaming and giving the ranch its current name after his sons Kent and Carroll, Shaffer soon built the Manor House and diversified into beef ranching. Shaffer, who was also the owner of the Rocky Mountain News at this time, would also purchase the Bradford/Perley House in 1926 to add to his property. Although he ran a profitable ranch for several decades, he was crushed during the Great Depression and eventually forfeited the property to the banks.

The next owner, a businessman named William Allen, subsequently bought the ranch in 1937. Although an executive in the burgeoning steel industry, he also decided to keep and breed cattle on the ranch, which remained profitable until his estate sold it to the Johns-Manville Corporation in 1971. This corporation then shaped the valley into its modern-day form by building a large corporate campus (meant to be their headquarters) as well as a housing community (originally for employees). The headquarter building became the modern Lockheed Martin building when it was sold to Martin Marietta Astronautics Group in 1987, and the plans for the housing community quickly evolved into present-day Ken Caryl Valley’s neighborhoods, whose homes were mostly completed by 1997. The community also was sure to maintain an emphasis on the natural and untouched aspect of the valley, and around 6,000 acres throughout the valley and its neighborhoods have since been dedicated to open space as part of the Jefferson County Open Space.

The Manor House remains restored to original glory and has served food and housed weddings on and off for the past decade or so. It can still be easily accessed and seen in the valley today.

The Bradford/Perley house was ravaged by a fire in 1967, leaving only a frame standing, and was added to the Colorado Preservation Inc. “Most Endangered Sites in Colorado” list in 2002. Fortunately, multiple efforts resulted in it being preserved as ruin in 2006, and subsequently Colorado Preservation Inc. moved the Bradford/Perley House to the “saved” list. It remains a stone frame protected by chain link fencing to this day and can be found easily in the North part of the valley, right next to the Bradford Pool.

Ken Caryl Ranch/Valley also has prominent geologic features, with the oldest rocks, along the bottom of the hillside rising into the foothills west of the Manor House, dating to around 600 million years ago. Following this further west, one can see the biggest mountain in the immediate foothills west of the Manor House, Tincup Mountain (Beacon Hill can also be seen- the shoulder on the south side of Tincup). The hogback (the ridge/rift running along the east side of the valley, opposite of the Foothills, that helps form the valley) is an interesting geologic phenomenon as well, formed from sedimentary layers being pushed upwards around 70 million years ago.

Geography

Demographics

As of the 2010 census, there were 32,438 people, 12,677 households, and 9,041 families residing in the CDP. The racial makeup of the city was 91.8% White, 2.2% Asian, 0.8% African American, 0.5% American Indian, 2.1% from other races, and 2.6% from two or more races. Hispanics and Latinos of any race were 9.6% of the population.

There were 12,677 households, out of which 35.3% had children under the age of 18 living with them, 57.2% were married couples living together, 4.4% had a male householder with no wife present, 9.7% had a female householder with no husband present, and 28.7% were non-families. 23.1% of all households were made up of individuals, and 5.3% had someone living alone who was 65 years of age or older. The average household size was 2.56, and the average family size was 3.03.

The median age in the CDP was 39.0 years. 25.0% of residents were under the age of 18; 7.3% were between the ages of 18 and 24; 27.0% were from 25 to 44; 32.5% were from 45 to 64; and 8.2% were 65 years of age or older. The gender makeup of the city was 49.0% male and 51.0% female.

The median income for a household in the CDP was $84,153, and the median income for a family was $95,753. Males had a median income of $61,275 versus $47,104 for females. The per capita income for the CDP was $36,862. About 1.7% of families and 3.8% of the population were below the poverty line, including 2.9% of those under age 18 and 4.9% of those age 65 or over.

Business
Lockheed Martin and its predecessor, Martin Marietta, operate a facility located in the southern part of Ken Caryl Valley.

Education

Ken Caryl is served by the Jefferson County Public Schools. Zoned schools for the CDP include:
 Elementary schools: Bradford K8, Colorow, Coronado, Mortenson, Shaffer, Stony Creek, and Ute Meadows
 Middle schools: Deer Creek, Falcon Bluffs, and Summit Ridge
 Chatfield High School and Dakota Ridge High School

In popular culture
In the South Park episode Trapped in the Closet, a reference is made to FunPlex, an amusement center in Ken Caryl, though it has been renamed multiple times since then; first Fat City, then Mr. Biggs, and finally the current name, Fun City. Fun City closed in the summer of 2015, and the building was subsequently demolished.

See also

Outline of Colorado
Index of Colorado-related articles
State of Colorado
Colorado cities and towns
Colorado census designated places
Colorado counties
Jefferson County, Colorado
List of statistical areas in Colorado
Front Range Urban Corridor
North Central Colorado Urban Area
Denver-Aurora-Boulder, CO Combined Statistical Area
Denver-Aurora-Broomfield, CO Metropolitan Statistical Area

References

External links

Ken-Caryl Ranch Metropolitan District
Ken-Caryl Ranch Water District
Jefferson County website
Jeffco Public Schools

Census-designated places in Jefferson County, Colorado
Census-designated places in Colorado
Denver metropolitan area